Gjessø is a small town near Silkeborg in Denmark with a population of 817 (1 January 2022).

Gjessø is famous for its big lake which fills half of the town. It is used every year by tourists and natives.

Notable people 
 Simon Trier (born 1998 in Gjessø) a Danish professional footballer who plays as a left back for Kolding IF

References

External links
 The Danish homepage for Gjessø:

Cities and towns in the Central Denmark Region
Silkeborg Municipality